Theeram is a 2017 Indian Malayalam film, directed by Saheed Arafath and scripted by Ansar Thajudeen from Prinish Prabhakaran's story. The Lead roles are done by Maria John and Pranav Ratheesh. Theeram Portraits An ordinary young man, Ali, makes a living by riding an auto rickshaw in the night. One day, he meets a woman called Suhra and falls in love with her. It tries to woo her in various ways but something from his past crops up, haunting his present.

Cast 
 Maria John as Suhra
 Pranav Ratheesh as Ali
 Tini Tom as the cop
 Dini Daniel
 Sudhi Koppa
 Nandan Unni
 Askar Ali
 Krishna Praba
 Anjali Nair

Soundtrack 
The film's soundtrack is composed by Afzal Yusuff whereas lyrics being written by Harinarayanan BK, Aji Katoor, Rinu Razak and Siby Padiyara.

Release 
The movie was released on 19 May 2017. It got mixed reviews from the viewers and has not been released on any OTT platforms yet.

Reception 
K. R. Rejeesh from NOW RUNNING wrote, 'Theeram' is a shoddily made romantic drama and it fails to score on promising premises.

The movie apparently got a rating of 6.3 on Imdb.

References

External links

2010s Malayalam-language films